La colmena (tr. The Beehive or The Hive) is a 1982 Spanish film directed by Mario Camus. Based on the novel The Hive by Camilo José Cela, it depicts the aftermath of the Spanish Civil War and its impact on several characters. Cela has a small role as Matías Martí.

Synopsis 
The film is set in Madrid during the postwar period, beginning in 1942. The population suffers the consequences of the civil war. A group of members of a social gathering meet every day in the café La Delicia.

Cast 
 Victoria Abril (Julita)
 Francisco Algora (Ramón Maello)
 Rafael Alonso (Julián Suárez La fotógrafa)
 Ana Belén (Victorita)
 José Bódalo (Don Roque)
 Mary Carrillo (Doña Asunción)
 Camilo José Cela (Matías Martí)
 Queta Claver (Doña Matilde)
 Luis Escobar (Don Ibrahim)
 Fiorella Faltoyano (Filo)
 Agustín González (Mario de la Vega)
 Emilio Gutiérrez Caba (Ventura Aguado)
 Rafael Hernández (Padilla)
 Charo López (Nati Robles)
 José Luis López Vázquez (Leonardo Meléndez)
 Antonio Mingote (Señor de luto)
 Mario Pardo (Rubio Antofagasta)
 Encarna Paso (madre de Victorita)
 María Luisa Ponte (Doña Rosa)
 Elvira Quintillá (Doña Visitación)
 Francisco Rabal (Ricardo Sorbedo)
 Antonio Resines (Pepe El Astilla)
 José Sacristán (Martín Marco López)
 José Sazatornil (Tesifonte Ovejero)
 Elena María Tejeiro (Señorita Elvira)
 Ricardo Tundidor (Roberto González)
 Concha Velasco (Purita)
 Manuel Zarzo (Consorcio López)
 Imanol Arias (Novio de Victorita)
 Luis Barbero (Pepe)
 Luis Ciges (Don Casimiro)
 Marta Fernández Muro (Amparito)
 Miguel Rellán (Cliente del prostíbulo)
 José Vivó (Prestamista)

Awards
The film was entered into the 33rd Berlin International Film Festival where it won the Golden Bear.

References

External links 
 

1982 films
1982 drama films
Spanish drama films
1980s Spanish-language films
Films based on Spanish novels
Spanish Civil War films
Films directed by Mario Camus
Golden Bear winners
Films set in the 1940s
Madrid in fiction
Spain in fiction
Films set in restaurants
Camilo José Cela
1980s Spanish films